Kevin Ford may refer to:

 Kevin A. Ford (born 1960), U.S. astronaut
 Kevin Ford (boxer) (born 1962), retired American heavyweight boxer
 Kevin Ford (mathematician) (born 1967), American mathematician
 Kevin Ford (producer) (born 1992), American artist, producer and singer
 Kevin Ford, a fictional character, codename Wither, appearing in Marvel Comics
 Kevin Ford, real name of drum and bass producer DJ Hype